Grantstown Wood and Grantstown Lough is a national nature reserve of approximately  located in County Laois, Ireland. It is managed by the Irish National Parks & Wildlife Service.

Features
Grantstown Wood and Grantstown Lough, sometimes written Granston, was legally protected as a national nature reserve by the Irish government in 1982. It is very close to another nature reserve, Coolacurragh Wood. The area was formerly the demesne of Grantstown Manor.

Grantstown Wood is a wet woodland, with rich base soils. The woodland is predominantly ash, alder and birch, with an under planting of hawthorn, meadowsweet, nettle and brambles. The lough has infilled gradually with fen to alder carr. The reserve also has a lake which provides fish for otters, kingfishers and cormorants. Perch, pike, eel, rudd and tench fish are found in the lake.

The site has two looped walks, a Lake Walk and a Wood Walk.

References

Geography of County Laois
Forests and woodlands of the Republic of Ireland
Nature reserves in the Republic of Ireland
Tourist attractions in County Laois